Gnanapureeswarar Temple, Tiruvadishoolam (ஞானபுரீஸ்வரர் கோயில், திருவடிசூலம்) is a Hindu temple located at Tiruvadishoolam near Chengalpattu in the Chengalpattu district of Tamil Nadu, India.

References

External links 
 

Hindu temples in Kanchipuram district
Padal Petra Stalam